Boy A is a 2007 British drama film directed by John Crowley, from a screenplay by Mark O'Rowe, based on the 2004 novel of the same name by Jonathan Trigell. The film stars Andrew Garfield as Jack Burridge (né Eric Wilson), who is re-entering society under a new name in Manchester after having served 14 years in a juvenile prison, and Peter Mullan as Terry, Jack's caseworker.

Boy A had its world premiere at the 32nd Toronto International Film Festival on 8 September 2007. It was released as a television film in the United Kingdom, airing on Channel 4 on 26 November 2007, and was theatrically released in the United States by The Weinstein Company on 23 July 2008. The film received generally positive reviews from critics, with Garfield winning a British Academy Television Award for his performance.

Plot
Andrew Garfield portrays Eric Wilson. The film commences when Eric is released from either a secure unit or prison under the name Jack Burridge. His past is told through flashbacks.

Eric Wilson befriends Philip Craig, who is a troublemaker and rescues him from a group of bullies. It is later disclosed that Philip is the victim of rape perpetrated by his older brother. Philip gets into an argument with a girl from their school who comes across the two boys loitering in a park. She criticizes them and refers to them as "scum" when she witnesses Philip vandalising a park sign with a Stanley knife. Philip approaches her and starts slashing at her forearms with the knife. He grabs the girl and drags her under a bridge. When Philip drops the knife, Eric picks it up, and follows them under the bridge. The girl is killed, although the film shows neither who kills her nor how.  Eric (dubbed as Boy A during the trial) and Philip are remanded into custody at secure units. Philip ends up dead, assumed to be suicide, but Eric believes that he may have been killed by youth offenders.

Eric is later released and is guided by social worker Terry (Peter Mullan). Eric, shy and eager to be a good citizen again, builds up a new life under the name Jack Burridge. He finds a job, befriends his colleague Chris (Shaun Evans), falls in love with the office girl, Michelle (Katie Lyons), and rescues a little girl who would otherwise have died after a car crash. An article in a local newspaper portrays him as a hero and includes a picture of both boys in the story. Eric wants to be honest with Michelle and reveal his past, but Terry urges him not to do so because it is too dangerous. Terry is afraid that people may attack Eric because there is a reward of £20,000 for finding him. Terry argues that it is not dishonest because "Eric is history and Jack is a new person".

The rehabilitation worker is less satisfied with his own son. The son discovers Eric's true identity from newspaper articles about him being released, his new role as the hero and information he looks up without permission on his father's computer. Out of jealousy, he reveals this to the public and as a result, Eric loses his job and his best friend Chris distances himself from him. Michelle goes missing, and people suspect that Eric is somehow involved, though it is later revealed she has sequestered herself at home, devastated about the revelation that Jack is actually Eric.

Eric repeatedly tries to phone Terry but gets his voicemail. He flees from his home to avoid reporters and travels to Blackpool. There he meets (or imagines meeting) Michelle, who tells him she was not the one who revealed his past and would have eventually understood if he told her the truth, and then leaves. After saying farewell messages in voicemails to Terry and Chris, the film concludes with Eric standing over the edge of a pier.

Cast

Reception

Box office
Boy A received a limited release in North America in 10 theatres and grossed $113,662. The film grossed $1,647,281 in other territories for a worldwide total of $1,760,943.

Critical response
On the review aggregator website Rotten Tomatoes, Boy A has a 88% "certified fresh" rating based on 59 reviews. The website's consensus reads, "Small in scale but large in impact, Boy As career making performances (particularly that by star Andrew Garfield) and carefully crafted characters defy judgment and aggressively provoke debate." On Metacritic, it has a weighted average score of 75 out of 100, based on 22 critics, indicating "generally favorable reviews".

Stephen Holden of The New York Times called the film a "wrenching melodrama". Wesley Morris of The Boston Globe praised Garfield's performance, writing that "the movie is worth seeing for Garfield".

Awards and nominations

References

External links
 
 
 

2007 films
2007 drama films
2007 independent films
2007 television films
2000s psychological drama films
British drama television films
British independent films
British psychological drama films
2000s English-language films
Films about bullying
Films based on British novels
Films directed by John Crowley
Films set in Manchester
Films shot in Greater Manchester
Film4 Productions films
Channel 4 television films
Melodrama films
Television films based on books
The Weinstein Company films
2000s British films